Ifenprodil is an inhibitor of the NMDA receptor, specifically of GluN1 (glycine-binding NMDA receptor subunit 1) and GluN2B (glutamate-binding NMDA receptor subunit 2) subunits. Additionally, ifenprodil inhibits GIRK channels, and interacts with alpha1 adrenergic, serotonin, and sigma receptors.

NMDA receptors are multimeric ionotropic glutamate receptors composed of four subunits. GluN1 is obligate for functional expression. Other subunits include GluN2A, GluN2B, and the more recently discovered GluN3 subunits. Ifenprodil selectively inhibits NMDA receptors containing the GluN2B subunit.

As ifenprodil tartrate, it has been marketed in some countries, including Japan and France, as a cerebral vasodilator, under the trade names Cerocral, Dilvax, and Vadilex.

Ifenprodil has been studied as a possible medication to prevent tinnitus after acoustic trauma.

It is currently in phase III clinical trials to treat SARS-CoV2 infection and phase II trials for idiopathic pulmonary fibrosis.

References

NMDA receptor antagonists
Piperidines
Phenylethanolamines
Sigma receptor ligands
Phenols
Substituted amphetamines